Beach House is an American dream pop duo.

Beach House may also refer to:

 Beach house, a house on or near a beach

Film and television
 Beach House (film) (Casotto), a 1977 Italian comedy
 The Beach House (2018 film), an American television film adaptation of the novel by Mary Alice Monroe (see below)
 The Beach House (2019 film), an American horror film
 "Beach House" (Brooklyn Nine-Nine), a television episode
 La casa en la playa (The house on the beach), a 2000 Mexican telenovela

Music
 Beach House (album), by Beach House, 2006
 Beach House EP by Ty Dolla Sign, 2014
 "Beach House" (The Chainsmokers song), 2018
 "Beach House" (Carly Rae Jepsen song), 2022

Other uses
 Beach House, Worthing, England
 The Beachouse, Glenelg, South Australia
 The Beach House, a 2002 novel by Mary Alice Monroe
Beach House, a 1992 novel by R.L. Stine

See also
 Beech House (disambiguation)